Bantuil is a village in Cerbon District, Barito Kuala Regency, South Kalimantan, Indonesia.

Infrastructure
A local school in the village serves about 120 children.

In 2017, an affordable housing initiative added fourteen houses to the village.

References

Populated places in South Kalimantan